Thilina Suranda is a Sri Lankan international footballer who plays as a defender for Don Bosco in the Sri Lanka Football Premier League.

References

Sri Lankan footballers
1985 births
Living people
Sri Lanka international footballers
Association football defenders
Sri Lanka Football Premier League players